The Foothill League is a high school athletic conference in the Santa Clarita Valley area of Los Angeles County, California that is affiliated with the CIF Southern Section. All current members are part of the William S. Hart Union High School District.

Schools
As of 2018, the schools in the league are:
Canyon High School
Castaic High School
Golden Valley High School	
Hart High School
Saugus High School
Valencia High School
West Ranch High School

Former members
 Burbank High School (through 2006; joined Pacific League
 Burroughs High School (through 2006; joined Pacific League)

Sports
The Foothill League sponsors the following sports:

Fall season
 Football
 Cross country
 Girls' golf
 Girls' tennis
 Girls' volleyball

Winter season
 Basketball
 Soccer

Spring season
 Baseball
 Boys' golf
 Lacrosse
 Softball
 Swimming/Diving
 Track and field
 Boys' tennis
 Boys' volleyball

History
The Foothill League is one of the earliest CIF-SS leagues in existence. Membership has historically included schools throughout Los Angeles County, including in the Santa Clarita Valley, Burbank, Glendale, and the San Gabriel Valley. In the 1930s, the league's footprint extended as far south as Fullerton.

In 2006, Burbank and Burroughs high schools in Burbank left the Foothill League to join the Pacific League to reduce travel expenses and become more competitive. Since then, the Foothill League has been composed exclusively of Hart District schools.

References

CIF Southern Section leagues
Sports in Los Angeles County, California